Berta Hoerner Hader (August 1, 1890 – February 6, 1976) and Elmer Stanley Hader (September 7, 1889 – September 7, 1973) were an American couple who jointly illustrated more than 70 children's books, about half of which they also wrote. They won the annual Caldecott Medal for The Big Snow (1948), recognizing the year's "most distinguished American picture book for children". They received the Caldecott Honor Book Award for Cock-a-doodle-doo in 1940 and The Mighty Hunter in 1944.

Biography
Berta Hoerner was born in San Pedro, Coahuila, Mexico, where her parents Albert and Adelaide unsuccessfully tried to grow cotton with Albert's brother. The family moved 100 km to the east, to the resort town of Parras, Mexico, when Berta was three, then soon-after to Amarillo, Texas, where her father ran a grocery store. Her father died when Berta was five, and the family soon moved to the northeast of the United States. Berta, perhaps inspired by her mother's colorful sketches of Mexican life, took art classes and read extensively while still in elementary school, winning literary and artistic prizes for her work. The family again moved in 1909, this time to Seattle, Washington. While Berta's mother worked for Charity Organization Society and Washington's Home, Berta continued painting and reading, and eventually attended the University of Washington School of Journalism (1909–1912). She also apprenticed at Western Engraving Company, where she learned printing design, fashion design, illustration, and printing skills. Berta's supervisor, Eva Shepard, moved to San Francisco, and handed over her fashion work in Seattle to Berta. When Ms. Shepard then took a position in New York, Ms. Shepard asked Berta to take over her free-lance fashion illustration business in San Francisco. Berta agreed and, to further her training, she spent the summer of 1915 attending art school in Carmel, California. In the fall she moved to San Francisco, took over Eva Shepard's fashion illustration work, and attended the California School of Design, where she studies from 1915-1918. While in San Francisco, Berta befriended Rose Wilder Lane (daughter of then-unknown writer Laura Ingalls Wilder), with whom she later rented a Telegraph Hill studio (1413 Montgomery Street). Berta first met her future husband Elmer at this studio. Berta had also befriended Bessie "Mother" Beatty during her time in San Francisco. After Ms. Beatty's adventures covering the Russian Revolution (The Red Heart of Russia, 1918), she invited Berta to New York City to do fashion design illustration for McCall's, where Ms. Beatty had become an editor.

Elmer Hader was born in Pajaro, California, but spent much of his youth in San Francisco. At the age of 16, as a member of the National Guard, he helped restore order to San Francisco after the 1906 earthquake. He worked briefly in a survey party up the American River (near Sacramento, California), then returned to San Francisco to work as a firefighter on the State Belt Railroad (a dock-side railroad that acted as a shuttle for goods and people), where his father worked as an engineer. Elmer used his earnings from this job to pay for his first term at California School of Design. He then obtained scholarships to finish at the school (1907–1910). Elmer was also involved in theatre, and was supported by two theatrical groups, including his time in Paris at the Académie Julian from 1912-1914. He was so successful at vaudeville routines in France and the U.S. (on the Pantages circuit), in which he would do a "Painting a Minute" act and, later, a living statue routine (in which individuals were made up to appear to be statues), that he considered dropping his long-term goal of becoming an artist. He did not. He returned to San Francisco, set up a studio in his parents attic, painted, taught art, and arranged exhibits. Elmer was the first artist showcased in a one-man one themed show at the Palace of Fine Arts. He was drafted into the U.S. Army and returned to France in 1918 as a member of the Camouflage Corps, just at the time that Berta was asked by Ms. Beatty to come to New York to work in fashion design illustration at McCalls.

When Elmer and Berta met in San Francisco, they had both been part of a broad network of artists and intellectuals in the area. They became good friends, and, rather than return to San Francisco, Elmer went directly to New York when he was demobilized in February 1919. Berta was working for McCall's. The two married in July of that year, then lived briefly in Greenwich Village. Seeking a more rustic setting, they left the city to rent the Lyall Cottage in Grand View-on-Hudson, a small town in rural Rockland County, New York on the west bank of the Hudson River. This would become the area where they would spend the rest of their lives. Their home, which took more than twenty years to construct, was largely built by the Haders and their friends, and the house became an art project in its own right. Elmer went so far as to extract the stones used to build the house from the earth himself. The Haders had a son in the early 1920s, Hamilton (named after the author Hamilton Williamson), who died from meningitis not long before he turned three. They retreated to a friend's home in Maine to grieve and heal. They returned to New York to continue work on their home and to continue their artistic careers contributing artwork to many magazines, creating broadsides, pamphlets, painting miniatures (Berta) and portraits (Elmer).

Career
The two used their talents and Berta's connections to prepare children's sections for Good Housekeeping, McCall's, Pictorial Review, Asia, Century, and The Christian Science Monitor. They did pictures and cut-outs, often featuring children dressed in national costumes. In Berta and Elmer Hader's Picture Book of Mother Goose, the couple collated pen-and-ink and color drawings they had done for Monitor and Good Housekeeping to great acclaim. When the US Postal Service dis-allowed the sending of magazines with cut-out segments in 1926, the Haders switched gears, gaining a contract with MacMillan for a series of children's books. They began writing the stories for some of the books in this period. Demand for their product soared, and they worked incessantly from 1927–1931, illustrating, in some cases writing, producing, and helping to sell thirty-four titles. They stayed busy for the rest of their lives, producing another seventy or so books before they retired in 1964. One book in particular, Billy Butter (1936), so impressed writer John Steinbeck that he requested Elmer Hader do the cover to The Grapes of Wrath (1939). Hader eventually did covers for two other Steinbeck works, East of Eden (1952) and The Winter of Our Discontent (1961).

The Haders were early champions of conservation, animal protection, and pacifism. This made its way into their work, particularly with titles such as The Runaways (1956) and Two Is Company, Three's a Crowd (1965?). In the early 1950s, Berta became a community activist, ignited by the seemingly lost cause of having the location of the proposed Tappan Zee Bridge moved to a less sensitive area than its planned path through her village. Though The New York Times accused her of "blocking progress," the New York State Thruway Authority eventually relented, and the massive 4,88 km-long bridge was built several kilometers to the north at Nyack, where the bridge still stands today.

Berta and Elmer travelled extensively in Mexico, Jamaica, and the far northeast of the United States, some of which made its way into their work. 'The Story of Pancho and the Bull with the Crooked Tail" (1942), Jamaica Johnny (1943), and Tommy Thatcher Goes to Sea (1950) are all informed by their travels. Elmer died on his 84th birthday at his home in Grand-View-on-Hudson. Berta remained at the home until shortly before she died 1976 February 6 at the age of 85.

Selected worksBERTA AND ELMER HADER PAPERS, de Grummond Collection, McCain Library and Archives, University of Southern Mississippi

Author/illustrators 
"Happy Hours", 1927-1928, seven small picture books
The Picture Book of Travel, 1928
What'll You Do When You Grow Up? A Book for Very Young People Who haven't Made Up Their Minds, 1929
Berta and Elmer Hader's Picture Book of Mother Goose, 1930
Lion Cub: A Jungle Tale, 1931
Midget and Bridget, 1934
Billy Butter - The Tale of A Little Brown Goat, 1936
Tommy Thatcher Goes to Sea, 1937
Cricket: The Story of a Little Circus Pony, 1938
Cock-a-Doodle Doo, 1939
The Cat and the Kitten, 1940
Little Town, 1941
Pancho, 1942
The Mighty Hunter, 1943
The Little Stone House, 1944
Rainbow's End, 1945
The Skyrocket, 1946
The Big Snow, 1948
Little Appaloosa, 1949
Squirrely of Willow Hill, 1950
The Farmer in the Dell Hardcover, 1951
The Friendly Phoebe, 1953
Wish on the Moon, 1954
Home on the Range: Jeremiah Jones and His Friend Little Bear in the Far West, 1955
Ding Dong Bell, Pussy's in the Well, 1957
Little Chip of Willow Hill, 1958
Reindeer Trail - a Long Journey from Lapland to Alaska, 1959
Mister Billy's Gun, 1960
Quack Quack: The Story of a Little Wild Duck, 1961
Little Antelope an Indian for a Day, 1962
Snow in the City, 1963
Two is Company, Three's a Crowd, 1965

Illustrators 
Baby Bear, by Hamilton Williamson, 1930
Banana Tree, by Phillis Garrard, 1938
Timothy Has Ideas, by Miriam E. Mason. Macmillan, 1943.

See also

References 
The above information, except where otherwise noted, has been summarized from an article by Elaine and Edward Kemp in Imprint: Oregon, volume 3, 1977 spring-fall, pages 5–11. Amongst other research, the Kemps gained information through correspondence with several friends of the Haders, such as J. J. Marquis, Jane Terrill Barrow, Ruth and Latrobe Carroll, and Doris Patee.

External links
 Hader Connection, nonprofit established by niece Joy Hoerner Rich
 Berta and Elmer Hader Papers 1930–1948, University of Minnesota
 Guide to the Concordia University Berta and Elmer Hader Illustrations Collection 1919–1961, Concordia University
 Guide to the Berta and Elmer Hader Papers 1906–1974, University of Oregon
 
 
 Elmer Hader at LC Authorities, 70 records, and WorldCat

 

American children's writers
American children's book illustrators
Caldecott Medal winners
Married couples
Art duos
Writing duos
People from San Pedro, Coahuila